Joseph Anderson (born November 21, 1988) is an American football wide receiver who is currently a free agent. He was signed by the Chicago Bears after going undrafted in the 2012 NFL Draft. He played college football at Louisiana Tech and Texas Southern.

He has also played for the Philadelphia Eagles and New York Jets of the NFL, and the Montreal Alouettes of the CFL.

College career
After graduating from Texas High School, Anderson attended Louisiana Tech University before transferring to Texas Southern, where he played for three years, playing in 34 games. He recorded 154 catches for 2010 yards and 13 touchdowns. Anderson also served as return specialist, returning 16 kickoffs for 289 yards. In his final season, Anderson caught 47 passes for 638 yards and four touchdowns, finishing sixth in the Southwestern Athletic Conference for receptions per game and ninth for receiving yards per game.

Professional career
Anderson was not drafted in the 2012 NFL Draft, and was later called by the Chicago Bears. After rookie minicamp, Anderson was officially signed by the team. In the third preseason game against the New York Giants, Anderson broke free to score the game-winning touchdown. On August 31, Anderson was among the final cuts, though he was later signed to the practice squad the following day. On October 30, Anderson was released from the practice squad, and replaced by Raymond Radway. Anderson was later brought back on November 6. He was later activated to the active roster after Robbie Gould was placed on injured reserve. After being activated to the active roster, Anderson stated that he would be active against the Green Bay Packers. Anderson was mainly used on special teams, and against the Packers, Anderson nearly blocked a punt, and made a fierce tackle of Randall Cobb on a kickoff, though the Bears still lost 21–13.

On November 5, 2013, Anderson was placed on injured reserve with an abdominal and groin injury. On November 11, Anderson was placed on waived/injured.

In November 2015, Anderson stood outside the Houston Texans stadium, NRG Stadium, with a sign requesting a spot on the team. Six weeks later, on December 22, he was signed by the New York Jets to the practice squad. After the 2015 season, the Jets released Anderson to open up roster space for their incoming rookies.

After participating in The Spring League, he signed with the Montreal Alouettes of the Canadian Football League in October 2018, but was released from the practice roster later that month.

References

External links
 Chicago Bears bio
 Louisiana Tech bio

1988 births
Living people
American football wide receivers
Chicago Bears players
Philadelphia Eagles players
New York Jets players
Texas Southern Tigers football players
Louisiana Tech Bulldogs football players
People from Texarkana, Texas